Night Watch or Nightwatch may refer to:

Books
 The Night Watch, a 1977 memoir by Central Intelligence Agency officer David Atlee Phillips

Novels
 Night Watch, a 1972 novel by American screenwriter Lucille Fletcher
 Night Watch, a 1989 UNACO novel by Alastair MacNeill
 Night Watch, a 1990 novel by American writer Robin Wayne Bailey
 Night Watch (Sigurðardóttir novel), a 1992 novel by Icelandic author Fríða Á. Sigurðardóttir
 The Night Watch, a 1997 novel by American-Canadian science fiction and fantasy author Sean Stewart
 Night Watch (Lukyanenko novel), a 1998 fantasy novel by Russian author Sergei Lukyanenko
 Nightwatch, a 1999 novel by American novelist and screenwriter Richard P. Henrick
 Night Watch (Discworld), a 2002 fantasy novel by British writer Terry Pratchett
 The Night Watch (Waters novel), a 2006 historical fiction novel by Sarah Waters
 Night Watch, a 2012 novel by American author, attorney, and former New York City prosecutor Linda Fairstein

Fictional elements
 Night's Watch, a group of characters from the A Song of Ice and Fire series of epic fantasy novels
 Nightwatch (comics), a fictional character appearing in American comic books published by Marvel Comics
 Raphael (Teenage Mutant Ninja Turtles) (also Nightwatcher), a fictional superhero

Films
 The Night Watch (1925 film), a French drama film directed by Marcel Silver
 The Night Watch (1926 film), a lost silent film directed by Fred Caldwell
 Night Watch (1928 film), an American drama film directed by Alexander Korda
 The Hole (1960 film) (also The Night Watch in the US), a French crime film directed by Jacques Becker
 Night Watch (1973 film), a British-American suspense-thriller film directed by Brian G. Hutton
 Nightwatch (1994 film), a Danish thriller film directed and written by Danish director Ole Bornedal
 Night Watch (1995 film), an American television spy film directed by David Jackson
 Nightwatch (1997 film), an American horror thriller film directed by Ole Bornedal
 Night Watch (2004 film), a Russian urban fantasy supernatural thriller film directed by Timur Bekmambetov
 Rond Nocturna, a 2005 film by Argentinian writer and filmmaker Edgardo Cozarinsky
 Nightwatching, a 2007 film directed by Peter Greenaway
 The Night Watch, a 2010 film adaptation of Sarah Waters' 2006 historical fiction novel The Night Watch

Music
 The Night Watch (album), a live album by the English rock band King Crimson
 "The Night Watch", the fourth track from King Crimson's 1974 album Starless and Bible Black
 "Night Watch", the eighth track from Tegan and Sara's 2009 album Sainthood
 Nightwatch (album), the second solo album from Kenny Loggins
 Nightwatch a 2003 album by Norwegian jazz vocalist and songwriter Silje Nergaard
 Noisia (also Nightwatch), a Dutch electronic music trio

Television
 CBS Overnight News (also CBS News Nightwatch), an American overnight news broadcast
 Nightwatch with Steve Scott, a weekday late-night documentary series in the UK on ITV
 Nightwatch, an unscripted television series broadcast by A&E

Other uses
 The Night Watch, a 1642 painting by Rembrandt van Rijn
 Night Watch (video game), a tactical role-playing game developed by Russian developer Nival Interactive
 Nochnoy Dozor (group), a group of mostly Russophone political activists living in Estonia
 Operation Nightwatch, a mission undertaken by Boeing E-4 and previously by Boeing EC-135s
 Watchman (law enforcement), organized groups of men to deter criminal activity and provide law enforcement
 Gender neutral term for Nightwatchman (cricket)